Li Wenhan (born ) is a Chinese singer and actor. He is best known as the lead singer of UNIQ, a Chinese-South Korean boy group formed by Yuehua Entertainment in 2014. In 2019, he participated in the Chinese survival program, Youth With You, finished 1st place, and debuted in Unine.

Biography

1994–2013: Early life and career beginnings

Wenhan has a background in classical guitar and swimming, practicing with Chinese Swimming Olympic Medalist, Sun Yang in their hometown of Hangzhou. Wenhan had his first swimming experience when he was thrown into the water by his dad and ever since then, he has developed a love for swimming. While attending high school in the United States, he auditioned for Yuehua Entertainment and passed. Before debuting with UNIQ, Wenhan had appeared on television in a diving reality show which aired nationwide on JSTV in April 2013.

2014–2018: Debut with UNIQ and acting roles

Wenhan and Yibo were the first members recruited by Yuehua Entertainment, later joined by other three members. On 16 October 2014 Wenhan debuted with UNIQ.

From April to August 2016, he was a fixed cast of the Korean talk show "Ni Hao China," which shared China's culture, lifestyle, tradition, economy, and more in an easily understandable and entertaining manner. Starting from late 2016, when tensions grew between China and South Korea because the United States and South Korea jointly announced the deployment of the Terminal High-Altitude Area Defense (THAAD), Wenhan was mainly active in China as an actor.

From June to September 2016, he was one of the main MCs for a Chinese sports variety program called 《星球者联盟》("The Players"), which was a reality program featuring a group of Chinese celebrity contestants who face off in various basketball-related challenges against rival teams including guest stars such as Kim Jong-kook and Kobe Bryant. In October 2016, he was confirmed as cast in the historical drama set in the Tang Dynasty era, 《熱血書院》("My Naughty Classmates") playing the prince Li Jingyu. "My Naughty Classmates" started airing every Wednesday on Youku from 4 July 2018.

In January 2017, he started filming for the romance web drama "Adventurous Romance" (命悬一线的浪漫) as the male lead. From 23 June to 27 September 2017 Wenhan filmed for the basketball idol drama titled "热血狂篮" (Basketball Fever), which is loosely based on the manga/anime "Slam Dunk." His character is Pei Chenhao, who is a basketball player for Huayang University team and the female lead's younger brother. "Basketball Fever" was released on iQiyi on 16 May 2018. On 19 November 2017, Wenhan attended the opening ceremony for his upcoming drama, 《想看你微笑》aka "Just Want to See You Smile" in Wuxi, Jiangsu. "Just Want to See You Smile" is an idol style light romance comedy that was released on Youku on 29 May 2018 and adapted from the Internet popular novel "世界这么大，只想看你微笑".

On 16 April 2018 Wenhan attended the opening ceremony for his new campus ping pong drama,《追球》(Chasing the Ball) in Shenzhen, China.

2019–2020: Youth With You and debut with UNINE

On 5 December 2018 Wenhan announced on his personal Weibo account that he will be participating in Chinese reality boy band survival show Youth With You aired on iQiyi. He consistently placed first and eventually debuted with UNINE with the center position, with a total of 8,457,091 votes in the final episode. Wenhan filmed a Variety show with his dad "When I Grow Up"《一路成年》which started airing on 27 August 2019 on Mango TV.
On 5 September, Li Wenhan was named the Chinese brand ambassador of ASH—艾熙, a prominent footwear company founded in 2000. Wenhan became the brand ambassador for Primera芙莉美娜 (16 August 2019) and 舒肤佳Safeguard (18 August 2019). Wenhan's sci-fi college romance drama, "Adventurous Romance"《命懸一線的浪漫》that he had filmed in January 2017 started airing on 6 September 2019 on iQiyi. He became the brand spokesperson for 美达施Metamucil (23 September 2019) and OSM欧诗漫 (16 October 2019). On 16 April 2020 Wenhan was announced as the Spokesperson of ZEESEA滋色 Makeup. On 17 April 2020 it was announced that Li Wenhan would participate in the dating variety show,《喜欢你我也是2》as a host. On 20 April 2020, it was announced that Li Wenhan is the Spokesperson for the popular ice cream brand 巧乐兹 via their official Weibo account. Li Wenhan was announced as the official China brand Ambassador of Elizabeth Arden on 29 April 2020. On 13 July 2020

Li Wenhan was confirmed to be in Dragon TV variety show, 《完美的夏天》("Perfect Summer"), which is set to air every Saturday starting 1 August. In August 2020, Wenhan became the celebrity judge for a video game contest variety show, 《荣耀美少女S2》or "Glory Girls S2". On 24 September 2020, Li Wenhan's show, 《2020超级企鹅联盟 SUPER PENGUIN LEAGUE》started airing, which is described as China’s first all-star basketball game reality show produced by Tencent Sports. 
Unine (band) disbanded on 6 October 2020.

2020-present: Solo career

Wenhan became the MC of Youku's music show "Super Hit" or 《宇宙打歌中心》which started airing 22 November 2020. Wenhan was announced to be a participant in a male boy band survival show called "Shine! Super Brothers" or 《追光吧哥哥》and the show started airing on 5 December 2020. On 3 December 2020 it was announced that Wenhan would participate in season 3 of Zhejiang TV's Variety show 《 I am the Actor | 我就是演员》.

On July 17 of 2021, Li Wenhan released his first solo EP "Wen"《汶》. The EP title "Wen" is taken from the second word in the name of "Li Wenhan", which also represents the meaning of "water".

On January 16, 2022 Li Wenhan attended the Press Conference for the Hangzhou Asian Games Organising Committee (HAGOC) authorized TV series "Upstream"《泳往直前》about swimming.  Wenhan is the male lead Zhou Yu in the swimming drama and during interviews Li Wenhan said he especially accepted the role because he was born in Hangzhou and was previously a representative of the Hangzhou Youth Swimming Team. After confirming his participation in the swimming drama "Upstream", Li Wenhan carried out strict special training; he trained, ate, and lived with professional swimmers together in order to create an immersive role.

Artistry and influences

He has named Wang Leehom as his musical influence. Wenhan has a background in classical guitar and has achieved professional guitar skills up to level 9. In sports, he has named Kobe Bryant, LeBron James, and Allen Iverson as his idols.

Discography

EPs

Singles

Filmography

Film

Television series

Television shows

Awards and nominations

References

External links

Living people
1994 births
Uniq (band) members
Chinese male television actors
Youth With You contestants
21st-century Chinese male actors
Musicians from Hangzhou
Male actors from Hangzhou
21st-century Chinese male singers
Singers from Zhejiang